Adam Hepburn may refer to:

 Adam Hepburn, Master of Hailes (died 1479), Scottish nobleman
 Adam Hepburn of Craggis (died 1513), Scottish nobleman
 Adam Hepburn, 2nd Earl of Bothwell (died 1513), Scottish nobleman
 Adam Hepburn, Lord Humbie (died 1656), Scottish judge, politician and soldier